This was the first edition of the tournament.

Dominic Stricker won the title after defeating Ernests Gulbis 5–7, 6–1, 6–3 in the final.

Seeds

Draw

Finals

Top half

Bottom half

References

External links
Main draw
Qualifying draw

Zug Open - 1